Mizuno is a Japanese surname. Notable people with the surname include:

, pen name of Ken Akamatsu (born 1968), Japanese manga artist
Eiji Mizuno, Japanese mixed martial artist
, Japanese manga artist and illustrator
, Japanese dancer and actress
, Japanese artist and manga artist
, Japanese weightlifter
, Japanese footballer
, Japanese professional wrestling personality
, Japanese financial executive
John Mizuno (born 1964), American politician
, Japanese footballer
, Japanese artist and manga artist
, Japanese baseball player
, Japanese daimyō
, Japanese daimyō
, Japanese freestyle skier
, Japanese politician
, Japanese footballer
, Japanese basketball coach
, Japanese actress
Lili Mizuno (born 2001), American rhythmic gymnast
, Japanese actress
, Japanese voice actress
, Japanese actress
, Japanese dancer and choreographer
, Japanese motorcycle racer
, Japanese daimyō
, Japanese politician and cabinet minister
Riko Mizuno (born 1932), American art dealer
, Japanese voice actress
, Japanese author and game designer
, Japanese motorcycle racer
, Japanese writer
Sonoya Mizuno, English actress, model and ballet dancer
, Japanese daimyō
, Japanese chemist
, Japanese daimyō
, Japanese daimyō
, Japanese daimyō
, Japanese samurai
, Japanese daimyō
, Japanese samurai
, Japanese samurai
, Japanese daimyō
, Japanese footballer
, Japanese footballer
, Japanese mixed martial artist
, Japanese manga artist
, Japanese astronomer
, Japanese idol, model, and singer
, Japanese actress
, Japanese television personality and actress

Fictional characters
, a character in the anime series Zombie Land Saga
 (also known as "Amy Mizuno" or "Amy Anderson"), a character in the manga series Sailor Moon
, a character in the manga series Tokyo Daigaku Monogatari
, a character in the manga series Desert Punk
, a character in the manga series The Prince of Tennis
Suzy Mizuno, a character in the manga series Zatch Bell!
, a character in the eroge Dōkyūsei 2

Japanese-language surnames